Tomoki Richard Hiwatashi (born January 20, 2000) is an American figure skater. He is the 2018 CS Inge Solar Memorial – Alpen Trophy bronze medalist and a two-time U.S. national medalist.

He is also the 2019 World Junior champion, the 2016 World Junior bronze medalist, a five-time medalist on the ISU Junior Grand Prix series, and the 2016 U.S. junior national champion.

Personal life 
Hiwatashi was born on January 20, 2000, in Englewood, New Jersey. His mother, Satomi, and father, Satoshi Hiwatashi, are both from Kobe, Japan. He was raised with two sisters. For much of his early life, he lived in the Chicago suburb Hoffman Estates. He currently trains and resides most of his time in Colorado Springs, Colorado.

Career

Early career 
Hiwatashi began skating at age five after a rink opened near his house. He competed on the juvenile level during the 2008–2009 season, placing fourth at the Upper Great Lakes Regional Championships. Continuing as a juvenile in 2009–2010, he won the bronze medal at the Upper Great Lakes Regionals before finishing sixth at the 2010 U.S. Championships. During the 2010–2011 season, he won the juvenile gold medal at both the Upper Great Lakes Regionals and the 2011 U.S. Championships.

In 2011–2012, Hiwatashi moved up to the intermediate level, winning the gold medal at the Upper Great Lakes Regionals and the 2012 U.S. Championships. He advanced to the novice level in 2012–13, winning the gold medal at the Upper Great Lakes Regionals, the Midwestern Sectionals, and the 2013 U.S. Championships.

Coached by Alexandre Fadeev in Wilmette, Illinois, Hiwatashi was scheduled to make his ISU Junior Grand Prix (JGP) debut in Mexico in early September 2013 but sustained a medial malleolus fracture in his left foot during an official practice at the competition. As a result, he missed the rest of the 2013–2014 season.

2014–2015 season 
Hiwatashi competed on the junior level during the 2014–2015 season. He won the bronze medal at the Midwestern Sectionals and placed fifth at the 2015 U.S. Championships. He ended his season with the junior gold medal at the International Challenge Cup.

2015–2016 season 
In 2015–2016, Hiwatashi debuted on the JGP series, placing fifth in Colorado Springs, Colorado before winning the bronze medal in Zagreb, Croatia. He won the junior silver medal at the Midwestern Sectionals, finishing second to Alexei Krasnozhon, and went on to become the junior national champion, outscoring Kevin Shum by 14.78 points for gold at the 2016 U.S. Championships. Later that month, he was selected to replace the injured Nathan Chen at the 2016 World Junior Championships in Debrecen, Hungary.

In March at the World Junior Championships, he placed sixth in the short program and third in the free skate to win the bronze medal behind Daniel Samohin of Israel and Nicolas Nadeau of Canada. He was coached by Alexander Ouriashev in Glen Ellyn, Illinois.

2016–2017 season 
Hiwatashi started his season at 2016 JGP Saint-Gervais, where he placed sixth. He competed at the 2016 CS Warsaw Cup, placing ninth, and finished fifteenth at the 2017 U.S. Championships on the senior level. During the season, he was coached by Kori Ade in Monument, Colorado.

2017–2018 season 
Hiwatashi won two bronze medals on the 2017 JGP circuit at 2017 JGP Riga and 2017 JGP Egna. At the 2018 U.S. Championships, he placed fifteenth in the short program, seventh in the free skate, and twelfth overall. He finished seventh at the 2018 World Junior Championships in Sofia, Bulgaria. By the end of the season, he was training under Christine Krall and Damon Allen in Colorado.

2018–2019 season 
In September 2018, Hiwatashi won the silver medal at the 2018 JGP Canada, behind Petr Gumennik.  He won another silver medal at his second event, the 2018 JGP Slovenia. These results qualified Hiwatashi to the 2018–19 Junior Grand Prix Final in Vancouver, Canada. He next competed on the senior level at the 2018 CS Alpen Trophy, where he won the bronze medal. Concluding the fall season at the Junior Grand Prix Final, he placed sixth overall after struggling in both programs.

At the 2019 U.S. Championships, Hiwatashi won the Pewter medal.

Due to US national champion Nathan Chen's schedule conflicting with the 2019 Four Continents Championships, Hiwatashi made his senior ISU Championship debut after being named to the Four Continents team with Vincent Zhou and Jason Brown. He set a new personal best score and placed eighth.

In his final event of the season, Hiwatashi competed at the 2019 World Junior Championships alongside countrymen Alexei Krasnozhon and Camden Pulkinen. He placed second in the short program, briefly holding the junior world record until it was reclaimed minutes later by Pulkinen. In the free skate, he placed second behind Russian competitor Roman Savosin after cleanly landing a quadruple toe loop-triple toe loop combination but popping a second planned quadruple toe loop to a double toe loop. However, his strong placement in the short program combined with his performance in the free skate allowed him to claim victory overall, and he became the World Junior Champion, ahead of Savosin and bronze medalist Daniel Grassl of Italy.

2019–2020 season 
Hiwatashi began his first full senior season with a fifth-place finish at the 2019 CS U.S. Classic.  Making this debut on the senior Grand Prix at the 2019 Internationaux de France, Hiwatashi placed tenth in the short program after multiple jump errors but rose to fifth place overall in the free skate.

Competing at the 2020 U.S. Championships, Hiwatashi placed fifth in the short program with a clean skate.  Third in the free skate, he won the bronze medal, standing on the senior national podium for the second time.  Despite placing third, he was not chosen for one of America's three berths at the 2020 World Championships, the third spot going to reigning World bronze medalist Vincent Zhou, who finished slightly under three points behind Hiwatashi in fourth.  Hiwatashi was instead assigned to compete at the 2020 Four Continents Championships in Seoul.  He placed ninth at Four Continents.

2020–2021 season 
With the coronavirus pandemic raging, Hiwatashi was assigned to compete at the 2020 Skate America, the ISU having made Grand Prix assignments based primarily on geography.  Hiwatashi placed fourth at the event, despite a fall and a singled jump in the free skate.

Competing at the 2021 U.S. Championships, also held in Las Vegas, Hiwatashi placed seventh.

2021–2022 season 
Hiwatashi began his season at the 2021 CS Lombardia Trophy, where he placed fifth. He was eleventh to start the Grand Prix at 2021 Skate Canada International. At his second event, the 2021 NHK Trophy, he placed ninth. After the free skate, Hiwatashi said he "wanted to focus on doing my three quads, and I was able to do that."

Scheduled to compete at the 2022 U.S. Championships in hopes of qualifying for the American Olympic team, Hiwatashi was forced to withdraw due to a positive COVID test. Despite this, he was named to the American team for the 2022 Four Continents Championships in Tallinn, where he was eighth.

2022–2023 season 
After winning the silver medal at the Skating Club of Boston's Cranberry Cup, Hiwatashi competed twice on the Grand Prix, finishing ninth at the 2022 MK John Wilson Trophy and then twelfth at the 2022 NHK Trophy.

Skating technique 
Unlike most skaters, Hiwatashi jumps and spins clockwise. He also can perform the Biellmann spin, an element rarely performed by men due to the flexibility it requires.

Programs

Competitive highlights 
GP: Grand Prix; CS: Challenger Series; JGP: Junior Grand Prix. Pewter medals (4th place) awarded only at U.S. national, sectional, and regional events.

2013–2014 to present

2008–2009 to 2012–2013

Detailed results

Senior level 

Small medals for short and free programs awarded only at ISU Championships. Pewter medals (fourth place) awarded only at U.S. domestic events. Current ISU world bests highlighted in bold and italic. Personal bests highlighted in bold.

Junior level 
Small medals for short and free programs awarded only at ISU Championships.

References

External links 

 
 Tomoki Hiwatashi at U.S. Figure Skating

2000 births
American male single skaters
Living people
People from Englewood, New Jersey
American sportspeople of Japanese descent
People from Hoffman Estates, Illinois
World Junior Figure Skating Championships medalists